Katherine Jane Humphries, CBE FBA (born 9 November 1948), is a Fellow of All Souls College, University of Oxford with the Title of Distinction of professor of economic history. Her research interest has been in economic growth and development and the industrial revolution. She is the former president of the Economic History Society and the current vice-president of the Economic History Association.

Early life 
Humphries gained her economics degree from Newnham College, Cambridge, in 1970; she went on to Cornell University to do both her masters and then her doctorate which she completed in 1973.

Career 
Her professional life began at University of Massachusetts Amherst, first as an assistant professor (1973–1979), then as an associate professor (1979–1980). She was lecturer at the University of Cambridge and later a fellow of Newnham College (1980–1995). In 1993, during her period at Newnham College, Humphries was a visiting fellow at the Centre for Population and Development within Harvard University's School of Public Health.

Humphries returned to Newnham College as reader in economics and economic history in 1995, she then took up a post as reader in economic history and fellow at All Souls College, University of Oxford in 1998. In 2004, she was awarded a Title of Distinction as professor of economic history at All Souls. In 2012, Humphries was elected a Fellow of the British Academy (FBA), the United Kingdom's national academy for the humanities and social sciences. After retiring from Oxford, she became Centennial Professor of Economic History at the London School of Economics in 2018.

Edited journals 
Humphries has sat on the editorial boards of a number of peer-reviewed journals. She is currently on the editorial boards of Gender, Work and Organization, and Feminist Economics.

Honours 
On 29 January 2016 Humphries received an honorary doctorate from the Faculty of Educational Sciences at Uppsala University, Sweden. In 2018 she received an honorary doctorate from Sheffield University. Her 2019 article 'Unreal Wages? Real Income and Economic Growth in England, 1260-1850', co-authored with Jacob Weisdorf, was awarded the 2019 Royal Economic Society Prize.

Selected bibliography

Books

Chapters in books

Journal articles 
 
 
 
 
 
 
 
 
 
 
 
 
Humphries, Jane; Weisdorf, Jacob (June 2015). "The Wages of Women in England, 1260–1850". Journal of Economic History. 75 (2): 405-447. https://doi.org/10.1017/S0022050715000662
Humphries, Jane; Weisdorf, Jacob (May 2019). "Unreal Wages? Real Income and Economic Growth in England, 1260-1850". Economic Journal. 129 (623), 2867-2887. https://doi.org/10.1093/ej/uez017

See also 
 Feminist economics
 List of feminist economists

References

External links 
 Profile: Jane Humphries Faculty of History, University of Oxford

1948 births
Alumni of Newnham College, Cambridge
Fellows of Newnham College, Cambridge
British historians
Commanders of the Order of the British Empire
Cornell University alumni
Academics of the University of Oxford
Fellows of All Souls College, Oxford
Feminist economists
Historians of economic thought
Living people
University of Massachusetts Amherst faculty
British women historians
Presidents of the International Association for Feminist Economics